is a Japanese rice cake made of , a short-grain japonica glutinous rice, and sometimes other ingredients such as water, sugar, and cornstarch. The rice is pounded into paste and molded into the desired shape. In Japan, it is traditionally made in a ceremony called . While eaten year-round, mochi is a traditional food for the Japanese New Year, and is commonly sold and eaten during that time.

Mochi is a multicomponent food consisting of polysaccharides, lipids, protein, and water. Mochi has a heterogeneous structure of amylopectin gel, starch grains, and air bubbles. The rice used for mochi has a negligible amylose content and a high amylopectin level, producing a gel-like consistency. The protein content of the japonica rice used to make mochi is higher than that of standard short-grain rice.

History 
The process of steaming glutinous rice and making it into a paste is considered to have its origin in ancient China and to have been introduced to Japan from Southeast Asia some time after rice cultivation was introduced to Japan at the end of the Jōmon period. Red rice was the original variant used in the production of mochi.

The cultural significance of mochi in Japan is unique, though it has elements in common with other auspicious foods in other Asian countries. According to archaeological research, the homemade production of mochi increased beginning in the 6th century (Kofun period), when earthenware steamers became popular in every household, mainly in eastern Japan.

According to the book, when a rich man made a flat mochi from leftover rice and shot an arrow at it, the mochi transformed into a white bird and flew away, and after that, the man's rice field became desolate and barren. This legend shows that round white mochi was historically held to have spiritual power.

In the Heian period (794–1185), mochi was often used in Shinto events to celebrate childbirth and marriage. According to the  compiled in the 12th century, emperors and nobilities used to put mochi into the mouths of babies that were 50 days old. In this period, it became customary in the aristocratic society for the bride and groom to eat mochi together at the bride's house three days after the wedding.

The first recorded accounts of mochi being used as a part of New Year's festivities are from the Heian period. The nobles of the Imperial court believed that long strands of freshly made mochi symbolized long life and well-being, while dried mochi helped strengthen one's teeth. Accounts of it can also be found in The Tale of Genji.

Mochi continues to be one of the traditional foods eaten around Japanese New Year and is sold and consumed in abundance around this time. A  is placed on family altars on December 28 each year.

Seasonal specialties

New Year
  is a New Year's decoration, which is traditionally broken and eaten in a ritual called  (mirror opening) and placed on family altars on December 28.
  is a soup containing rice cakes. It is also eaten on New Year's Day. In addition to mochi,  contains vegetables such as taro, carrot, honeywort, and red and white colored .
  is traditionally made on New Year's Day as an emblem of luck.

Spring 
The cherry blossom (sakura) is a symbol of Japan and signifies the onset of full-fledged spring.  is a pink-coloured mochi surrounding sweet red bean paste and wrapped in an edible, salted cherry blossom leaf; this dish is usually made during the spring.

Children's Day 
Children's Day is celebrated in Japan on May 5.
 is a variation of a  wrapped in bamboo leaves.

Girls' Day 
The three layers are coloured with jasmine flowers, water caltrop, and mugwort.

Traditional preparation 

Traditionally, mochi making is an important cultural event in Japan that involves members of a local community or family. Although less common today, the traditional process still exists in most rural areas, as well as in urban temples, shrines, and community spaces, especially in the days leading up to the new year. The traditional process of mochi-pounding (called ) involves whole rice as the only ingredient and takes place in three basic steps:
 Polished glutinous rice is soaked overnight and steamed.
 The steamed rice is mashed and pounded with wooden mallets in a traditional mortar. The work involves two people, one pounding and the other turning and wetting the mochi. They must keep a steady rhythm or they may accidentally injure each other with the heavy . 
 The sticky mass is cut or formed into shapes, for example spheres.

Modern preparation 

The modern preparation of mochi uses a sweet flour of sweet rice. The flour is mixed with water and cooked on a stovetop or in the microwave until it forms a sticky, opaque, white mass. This process is performed twice, stirring the mass in between until it becomes malleable and slightly transparent.

With modern equipment, mochi can be made at home, with the technology automating the laborious dough pounding. Household mochi appliances provide a suitable space where the environment of the dough can be controlled.

The assembly-line sections in mochi production control these aspects:
 Viscoelasticity or the products' chewiness by selecting specific species of rice
 Consistency of the dough during automated pounding process
 Size
 Flavourings and fillings

Varieties of glutinous and waxy rice are produced as major raw material for mochi. The rice is chosen for tensile strength and compressibility. One study found that in  rice 172 and BC3, amylopectin distribution varied and affected the hardness of mochi.  rice produced harder, brittle, grainy textures, all undesirable qualities except for ease of cutting. For mass production, the rice variety should be chewy, but easy to separate.

Generally, two types of machines are used for mochi production in an assembly line. One machine prepares the dough, while the other forms the dough into consistent shapes, unfilled or with filling. The first type of machine controls the temperature at which the rice gelatinizes. One study found that a temperature of  corresponds to the gelatinization of mochi. When the temperature fell below this point, the hardening was too slow. It was concluded that a processing temperature below  was unsuitable for dough preparation.

Processing 
Mochi is a variation of a low-calorie, low-fat rice cake. The cake has two essential raw materials, rice and water. Sticky rice (also called sweet rice, Oryza sativa var. glutinosa, glutinous sticky rice, glutinous rice, waxy rice, botan rice, biroin chal, mochi rice, pearl rice, and pulut), whether brown or white, is best for mochi-making, as long-grain varieties will not expand perfectly. Water is essential in the early stages of preparation. Other additives such as salt and other seasonings and flavourings are important for nutritive value and taste. However, additives can cause breakage of the mass, so should not be added to the rice before the cake is formed. The cake must be steamed (rather than boiled) until it gains a smooth and elastic texture. The balls of rice are then flattened and cut into pieces or shaped into rounds. The machines for mass production are a hugely expensive investment, and the product should have the proper moisture, to appeal to consumers.

Preservation 
While mochi can be refrigerated for a short storage period, it can also "become hard and not usable." The recommended preservation method is by freezing. The best method for freezing involves wrapping each mochi cake tightly in a sealed plastic bag. Although mochi can be kept in a freezer for almost one year, the frozen mochi may lose flavor and softness or get freezer-burned. Food additives, such as modified tapioca starch, can also extend the shelf life of mochi.

Ingredients 
Mochi is relatively simple to make, as only a few ingredients are needed for plain mochi.

Other ingredients may include water, sugar, and cornstarch (to prevent sticking). Additional other ingredients can be added to create different variations/flavors.

Nutrition 

The caloric content of a matchbox-sized piece of mochi is comparable to that of a bowl of rice. Japanese farmers were known to consume mochi during the winter to increase their stamina, while samurai took mochi on their expeditions, as it was easy to carry and prepare. Mochi is gluten- and cholesterol-free, as it is made from rice flour.

Chemistry and structural composition of glutinous rice 

Amylose and amylopectin are both components of starch and polysaccharides made from D-glucose units. The big difference between the two is that amylose is linear because it only has αlpha-1,4-glycosidic bonds. Amylopectin, though, is a branched polysaccharide because it has αlpha-1,4-glycosidic bonds with occasional αlpha-1,6-glycosidic bonds around every 22 D-glucose units. Glutinous rice is nearly 100% composed of amylopectin and almost completely lacks its counterpart, amylose, in its starch granules. A nonglutinous rice grain contains amylose at about 10–30% weight by weight and amylopectin at about 70–90% weight by weight.

Glutinous or waxy type of starches occur in maize, sorghum, wheat, and rice. An interesting characteristic of glutinous rice is that it stains red when iodine is added, whereas nonglutinous rice stains blue. This phenomenon occurs when iodine is mixed with iodide to form tri-iodide and penta-iodide. Penta-iodide intercalates between the starch molecules and stains amylose and amylopectin blue and red, respectively. The gelation and viscous texture of glutinous rice is due to amylopectin being more hygroscopic than amylose, thus water enters the starch granule, causing it to swell, while the amylose leaves the starch granule and becomes part of a colloidal solution. In other words, the higher the amylopectin content, the higher the swelling of the starch granule.

Though the amylopectin content plays a major role in the defined characteristic of viscosity in glutinous rice, factors such as heat also play a very important role in the swelling, since it enhances the uptake of water into the starch granule significantly. 

The high amylopectin content of waxy or glutinous starches is genetically controlled by the waxy or wax gene. Its quality of greater viscosity and gelation is dependent on the distribution of the amylopectin unit chains. Grains that have this gene are considered mutants, which explains why most of them are selectively bred to create a grain that is close to having or has a 0% amylose content. The table below summarizes the amylose and amylopectin content of different starches, waxy and nonwaxy:

The soaking of the glutinous rice is an elemental step in the preparation of mochi, either traditionally or industrially. During this process, glutinous rice decreases in protein content as it is soaked in water. The chemicals that make up the flavour of plain or "natural" mochi are ethyl acetate, ethanol, 2-butanol, 2 methyl 1-propanol, 1-butanol, isoamyl alcohol, 1-pentanol and propane acid.

Mochi is usually composed solely of glutinous rice, however, some variations may include the additions of salt, spices and flavourings such as cinnamon (cinnamaldehyde). Food additives such as sucrose, sorbitol or glycerol may be added to increase viscosity and therefore increase gelatinization. Additives that slow down retrogradation are not usually added since amylopectin has a very stable shelf life due to its high amylopectin content.

Viscoelasticity
Mochi's characteristic chewiness is due to the polysaccharides in it. The viscosity and elasticity that account for this chewiness are affected by many factors such as the starch concentration, configuration of the swollen starch granules, the conditions of heating (temperature, heating period and rate of heating) as well as the junction zones that interconnect each polymer chain. The more junction zones the substance has, the stronger the cohesiveness of the gel, thereby forming a more solid-like material. The perfect mochi has the perfect balance between viscosity and elasticity so that it is not inextensible and fragile but rather extensible yet firm.

Many tests have been conducted on the factors that affect the viscoelastic properties of mochi. As puncture tests show, samples with a higher solid (polysaccharide) content show an increased resistance and thereby a stronger and tougher gel. This increased resistance to the puncture test indicate that an increase in solute concentration leads to a more rigid and harder gel with an increased cohesiveness, internal binding, elasticity and springiness which means a decrease in material flow or an increase in viscosity. These results can also be brought about by an increase in heating time.

Sensory assessments of the hardness, stickiness and elasticity of mochi and their relationship with solute concentration and heating time were performed. Similar to the puncture test results, sensory tests determine that hardness and elasticity increase with increasing time of heating and solid concentration. However, stickiness of the samples increase with increasing time of heating and solid concentration until a certain level, above which the reverse is observed.

These relationships are important because too hard or elastic a mochi is undesirable, as is one that is too sticky and will stick to walls of the container.

Health hazards
Suffocation deaths are caused by mochi every year in Japan, especially among elderly people. In 2015, it was reported that according to the Tokyo Fire Department – which responds to choking cases – more than 100 people were hospitalised per year for choking on mochi in Tokyo alone. Also in Tokyo, between 2006 and 2009 there were 18 reported deaths resulting from choking on mochi. As a result of this risk, Japanese authorities put out yearly warnings, advising people to cut mochi into small pieces before consumption.

Popular uses
Mochi may be eaten alone as a major component of a main meal, and is used as an ingredient in other prepared foods.

Confectionery
For example,  is a soft round mochi stuffed with sweet filling, such as sweetened red bean paste or white bean paste.  is a version containing a whole strawberry inside.

 is a green variety of mochi flavored with mugwort.

Ice cream

Small balls of ice cream are wrapped inside a mochi covering to make mochi ice cream. In Japan, this is manufactured by the conglomerate Lotte under the name , "snow-viewing ".

Soup
In winter, Japanese people often eat it to warm themselves.
  (meaning "power udon") is a dish consisting of udon noodles in soup topped with toasted mochi.
 . See New Year specialties below.

Other variations

It is popular in the summertime, and often sold from trucks, not unlike ice cream trucks in Western countries.
  is not a true mochi, but a popular traditional Japanese confection made of flour, rice powder, buckwheat, and red bean paste.
  is a thick, jelly-like dessert. It is made of red bean paste, agar, and sugar.
  is deep fried rice cake twisted into a rope shape. It is often consumed during the Japanese Star Festival called . There is some confusion about its origin based on evidence from historical records of a dish called , which some scholars believe was a confection while others think it was an early form of the wheat noodle . ( was made from a mixture of wheat flour and rice flour).
"Moffles" (waffles made from toasted mochi) were introduced in about 2000. They are made in a specialized machine as well as a traditional waffle iron.
Mochi donuts are a hybrid confection originally popularized in Japan by the chain Mister Donut before spreading to the United States via Hawaii. This confection is "a cross between a traditional cake-like doughnut and chewy mochi dough similar to what's wrapped around ice cream". The Mister Donut style, also known as "pon de ring", uses tapioca flour and produces mochi donuts that are easy to pull apart. Another variation developed in the United States uses glutinous rice flour which produces a denser mochi donut akin to Hawaiian-style butter mochi. Mochi donuts made from glutinous rice flour "typically contain half the amount of calories as the standard cake or yeast doughnut".

Variations outside Japan

In Taiwan, a traditional Hakka and Hoklo pounded rice cake was called  and came in various styles and forms just like in Japan. Traditional Hakka  is served as glutinous rice dough, covered with peanut or sesame powder. Not until the Japanese era was Japanese-style mochi introduced and gained popularity. Nowadays, Taiwanese mochi often comes with bean paste fillings.

In China,  is made from glutinous rice flour mixed with a small amount of water to form balls and is then cooked and served in boiling water.  is typically filled with black sesame paste or peanut paste and served in the water that it was boiled in.

In Hong Kong and other Cantonese regions, the traditional  is made of glutinous rice flour in the shape of a ball, with fillings such as crushed peanuts, coconut, red bean paste, and black sesame paste. It can come in a variety of modern flavors such as green tea, mango, taro, strawberry, and more.

In Philippines, a traditional Filipino sweet snack similar to Japanese mochi is called . There is also another delicacy called espasol with a taste similar to Japanese , though made with roasted rice flour (not , roasted soy flour). These are small steamed rice balls with bean paste or peanut fillings. However they are not derived from the Japanese mochi, but are derivatives of the Chinese  (called  in the Philippines). They are also made with the native  process, which mixes ground slightly fermented cooked glutinous rice with coconut milk.

In Korea,  varieties are made of steamed glutinous rice or steamed glutinous rice flour.

In Indonesia,  is usually filled with sweet bean paste and covered with sesame seeds.  comes from Sukabumi, West Java and Semarang, Central Java. Another Indonesian mochi is yangko, a Yogyakarta mochi made from glutinuous rice.

In Malaysia,  is made from glutinous rice flour and filled with coconut filling and palm sugar. Another Chinese Malaysian variant,  is made with same ingredients but their fillings are filled with crushed peanuts. There is also , which has similar ingredients and texture to mochi but larger in size. The snack is quite popular in the east coast of Malaysia.

In Singapore,  is made from glutinous rice flour and is usually coated with either crushed peanuts or black sesame seeds.

In Hawaii, a dessert variety called "butter mochi" is made with mochiko, butter, sugar, coconut, and other ingredients then baked to make a sponge cake of sorts.

See also 
 Moon rabbit
 Japanese rice
 
 
 
 
 , rice crackers
 
 

Similar foods in other countries:
 , Korean glutinous rice cakes

References

External links
 Pounding Mochi with the Fastest Mochi Maker in Japan, YouTube.
 The Tale of Granny Mochi: Kuwata Misao - NHK - 2020

Hawaiian cuisine
Japanese cuisine
Japanese desserts and sweets
Hong Kong cuisine
Chinese cuisine
Taiwanese cuisine
Vietnamese cuisine
Asian cuisine
Glutinous rice dishes
Articles containing video clips
Potentially dangerous food
Japanese rice dishes